Sir Thomas Reade, 4th Baronet, (c.1684 - 1752) of Shipton Court, Oxfordshire was a British courtier and Whig politician who sat in the House of Commons for 34 years from 1713 to 1747. 

Reade was the second son of Sir Edward Reade, 2nd Baronet, of Shipton Court, and his wife Elizabeth  Harby, daughter of Edward Harby of Adstone, Northamptonshire. He was the elder brother of Lieutenant-general George Reade. He succeeded to the baronetcy and Shipton Court on the death of his elder brother, Sir Winwood Reade, 3rd Baronet, on 30 June 1692. He married  Jane Mary Dutton, the daughter of Sir Ralph Dutton, 1st Baronet, MP of Sherborne, Gloucestershire, on 29 October 1719.

Reade first stood for Parliament at a by-election for Oxfordshire in February 1710 and was heavily defeated. At the 1713 general election, he was elected Member of Parliament for Cricklade.

Reade was returned unopposed at Cricklade at the 1715 general election, but faced contests at the succeeding general elections of 1722, 1727 and 1734. At the 1741 general election he was caught up in a double return and was declared elected  on 24 December 1741. He did not stand at the  1747 general election.

Reade served as Clerk of the Household to Prince of Wales from about 1722 to 1727 and was promoted to Clerk of the Green Cloth when the Prince of Wales became King in 1727 to his death.

Reade died on 25 September 1752, and was referred to by Henry Pelham as ‘an old servant of the King’s, and a very honest man, but he has been declining for many years’. He and his wife had only one child, 
John, who succeeded him in the baronetcy.

References

External links 

1684 births
1752 deaths
17th-century English people
18th-century English people
Baronets in the Baronetage of England
Members of the Parliament of Great Britain for English constituencies
Members of Parliament for Cricklade
British MPs 1713–1715
British MPs 1715–1722
British MPs 1722–1727
British MPs 1727–1734
British MPs 1734–1741
British MPs 1741–1747